Peel Hall is a tram stop for Phase 3b of the Manchester Metrolink. The station opened on 3 November 2014 and is on the Airport Line on Simonsway next to the junction of Peel Hall Road. The station serves the Peel Hall district of Wythenshawe, Manchester.

Services
Trams run every 12 minutes north to Victoria and south to Manchester Airport (every 20 minutes before 6 am).

Ticket zones 
In January 2019, Metrolink ticketing was updated to use a zoned system, and Peel Hall was placed in zone 4.

References

External links

 Metrolink stop information
 Peel Hall area map
 Light Rail Transit Association
 Airport route map

Tram stops in Manchester